Uwais al-Qarani Mosque was a Shi'ite mosque in Raqqa, Syria, until it was demolished by Islamic State in Iraq and the Levant on May 31, 2014. It is currently awaiting reconstruction.

History

Dedication
It was adjacent to the Bab al-Baghdad, another major landmark in the city.

Construction
The original tombs were located in the old cemetery at the edge of the city. In 1988, Syrian President Hafez al Assad and the Supreme Leader of Shi'ite-majority Iran, Ayatollah Khomeini, initiated a project to develop a new mosque around the tombs. The work was completed in 2003 and a commemorative plaque credited President Bashar al Assad and Iranian President Mohammad Khatami with completing the project.

Destruction
In June 2013, rebel fighters from the Wahabi/ Salafi group al-Muntasereen Billah were living in the mosque complex. On March 26, 2014, the mosque was blown up by two powerful explosions and completely destroyed by Islamic State in Iraq and the Levant because it was a Shi'ite structure. More specifically, it was also built over graves and thus served as a shrine.

See also
 Destruction of cultural heritage by ISIL
 Destruction of early Islamic heritage sites
 Sayyidah Zaynab Mosque

References

21st-century mosques
Buildings and structures destroyed by ISIL
Destroyed mosques
Mosques in Raqqa
Shia Islam in Syria
Shia mosques in Syria
Buildings and structures demolished in 2014
Attacks on Shiite mosques
Mosques completed in 2003
Islamist attacks on mosques